L-space may refer to:

 The classical function spaces Lp and 
 L-space (topology), a hereditarily Lindelöf space
 The Banach lattice, an abstract normed Riesz space
 A location in the fictional Discworld setting